St. Catharines is a provincial electoral district in Ontario, Canada, that has been represented in the Legislative Assembly of Ontario since 1967.

The riding was redrawn in 1999, when Ontario adjusted all of its provincial electoral divisions to match those already existing at the federal level, and has matched the federal riding since. It currently consists of the part of the City of St. Catharines lying north of a line drawn from west to east along St. Paul Street West, St. Paul Crescent, Twelve Mile Creek, Glendale Avenue, Merrit Street and Glendale Avenue.

Members of Provincial Parliament
This riding has elected the following members of the Legislative Assembly of Ontario:

Election results

2007 electoral reform referendum

Sources

The 1999, 2003 and 2007 expenditure entries are taken from official candidate reports as listed by Elections Ontario. The figures cited are the Total Candidate's Campaign Expenses Subject to Limitation, and include transfers from constituency associations. The 1995 expenditures are taken from an official listing of election expenses published by Elections Ontario.
Elections Ontario Past Election Results

Ontario provincial electoral districts
Politics of St. Catharines